Stigmella longisacca is a moth of the family Nepticulidae. It is found in California, United States.

The wingspan is 3.2-4.4 mm. There are two and possibly three generations per year.

The larvae feed on Juglans species, including Juglans californica. They mine the leaves of their host plant.

External links
A taxonomic revision of the North American species of Stigmella (Lepidoptera: Nepticulidae)

Nepticulidae
Moths of North America
Moths described in 1982